Jhargram Lok Sabha constituency is one of the 543 parliamentary constituencies in India. The constituency centres on Jhargram in West Bengal. The seat is reserved for scheduled tribes. Four of the seven assembly segments of No. 33 Jhargram Lok Sabha constituency are in Jhargram district, two in Paschim Medinipur district and one assembly segment is in Purulia district.

Assembly segments

As per order of the Delimitation Commission issued in 2006 in respect of the delimitation of constituencies in the West Bengal, parliamentary constituency no. 33 Jhargram, reserved for Scheduled tribes (ST), is composed of the following segments:

Prior to delimitation, Jhargram Lok Sabha constituency was composed of the following assembly segments: Garhbeta East (assembly constituency no. 220), Garhbeta West (SC) (assembly constituency no. 221), Salbani (assembly constituency no. 222), Nayagram (ST) (assembly constituency no. 229), Gopiballavpur (assembly constituency no. 230), Jhargram (assembly constituency no. 231), Binpur (ST) (assembly constituency no. 232)

Members of Parliament

Election results

General election 2019

General election 2014

General election 2009

General election 2004

General election 1999

General elections 1962-2004
Most of the contests were multi-cornered. However, only winners and runners-up are mentioned below:

See also
 Jhargram
 List of Constituencies of the Lok Sabha

References

External links
Jhargram lok sabha  constituency election 2019 result details

Lok Sabha constituencies in West Bengal
Politics of Paschim Medinipur district